Dennis Van Zant (born June 1, 1952) is an American former professional basketball player who played one game in the American Basketball Association with the San Antonio Spurs.

Career
Van Zant played collegiately for Azusa Pacific until 1974. He was a First-team NCCAA All-American in 1973 and 1974.

He was drafted by the Los Angeles Lakers in the seventh round (120th overall) of the 1974 NBA Draft. 
He played for the Swiss Alpines of the European Professional Basketball League during the league's only season in early 1975.
He was signed by the ABA's San Antonio Spurs in July 1975 after impressing coach Bob Bass with his ball-handling ability during the rookie camp. He was released by the Spurs in November, having played only two minutes in one game, scoring as many points. He later played for the Santa Rosa Oilers in the Western Basketball Association.

References

1952 births
Living people
American men's basketball players
Azusa Pacific Cougars men's basketball players
Basketball players from California
Los Angeles Lakers draft picks
Power forwards (basketball)
San Antonio Spurs players